Mundoo (Dhivehi: މުންޑޫ) is one of the inhabited islands of Haddhunmati Atoll (code letter "Laamu"). It is located in the long reef fringing the eastern side of Haddummati.

History

Archaeology
This island has large ruins from the historical Maldivian Buddhist era. The stupa, then ruinous, was excavated by H. C. P. Bell in 1923. 

Nothing noteworthy was found at this site. The stupa had been much vandalized and was merely a low mound of rubble and sand. Almost all carved porites stones had been removed. Few traces of railings or steps remained.

A report was published in Bell's monograph.

Geography

Demography

References

Bell, H.C.P. The Maldive islands. Monograph on the History, Archaeology and Epigraphy. Reprint 1940 edn. Malé 1986.
Romero-Frias, Xavier. The Maldive Islanders, A Study of the Popular Culture of an Ancient Ocean Kingdom. Barcelona 1999.

Islands of the Maldives